Borbála Sóthy (born 21 December 1916) was a Hungarian swimmer. She competed in the women's 400 metre freestyle at the 1936 Summer Olympics.

References

External links
  

1916 births
Possibly living people
Hungarian female swimmers
Olympic swimmers of Hungary
Swimmers at the 1936 Summer Olympics
Place of birth missing
Hungarian female freestyle swimmers